Anne Stears is a South African former cricketer who played as a batter. She appeared in two One Day Internationals for South Africa, both at the 1997 World Cup.

References

External links
 
 

Living people
Date of birth missing (living people)
Year of birth missing (living people)
Place of birth missing (living people)
South African women cricketers
South Africa women One Day International cricketers